James Alvin Deas (January 8, 1895 – May 8, 1972), nicknamed "Yank", was an American Negro league catcher between 1917 and 1924.

A native of Savannah, Georgia, Deas made his Negro leagues debut in 1917 with the Bacharach Giants, and spent most of his career with the club. He also played for the Hilldale Club and the Lincoln Giants. Deas died in New York, New York in 1972 at age 77.

References

External links
 and Baseball-Reference Black Baseball stats and Seamheads

1895 births
1972 deaths
Bacharach Giants players
Hilldale Club players
Lincoln Giants players
Baseball catchers
Baseball players from Savannah, Georgia
20th-century African-American sportspeople
Burials at Long Island National Cemetery